WEQP is a Contemporary Christian formatted broadcast radio station licensed to Rustburg, Virginia, serving Lynchburg and Campbell County, Virginia.  WEQP is owned and operated by Calvary Chapel of Lynchburg.

Translator
WEQP is simulcast on WRXT-HD2 (FM 90.3-2). This digital station is carried by a translator.

References

External links
 Equip FM Online
 Equip FM on Facebook
 

2007 establishments in Virginia
Contemporary Christian radio stations in the United States
Radio stations established in 2007
EQP
Calvary Chapel Association
Campbell County, Virginia